Marzulli is a surname. Notable people with the surname include:

 Guido Marzulli (born 1943), Italian painter
  (1908–1991), Italian poet and writer
  (1907–1990), Italian painter

Italian-language surnames